Bernburg Hauptbahnhof is a railway station in the municipality of Bernburg, located in the Salzlandkreis district in Saxony-Anhalt, Germany.

References

Railway stations in Saxony-Anhalt
Buildings and structures in Salzlandkreis
Railway stations in Germany opened in 1846
1846 establishments in Prussia